French Settlement (historically ) is a village in Livingston Parish, Louisiana, United States. The population was 1,116 at the 2010 census. It is part of the Baton Rouge Metropolitan Statistical Area.

History
French Settlement was settled in 1800 via the Amite River by French, German, and Italian immigrants. The area was a thriving center of commerce, including cypress sawmills, animal trappers, shingle-making, farms, and a steamboat port.

French Settlement has four properties on the National Register of Historic Places listings in Livingston Parish, Louisiana.

Geography
French Settlement is located at  (30.304395, -90.798881).

Demographics

As of the 2020 United States census, there were 1,073 people, 348 households, and 240 families residing in the village.

As of the census of 2000, there were 945 people, 359 households, and 276 families residing in the village. The racial makeup of the village was 99.26% White, 0.21% Asian, 0.11% from other races, and 0.42% from two or more races. Hispanic or Latino of any race were 1.90% of the population.

There were 359 households, out of which 31.8% had children under the age of 18 living with them, 65.2% were married couples living together, 7.0% had a female householder with no husband present, and 23.1% were non-families. 18.4% of all households were made up of individuals, and 7.8% had someone living alone who was 65 years of age or older. The average household size was 2.63 and the average family size was 2.99.

In the village, the population was spread out, with 25.8% under the age of 18, 8.5% from 18 to 24, 29.3% from 25 to 44, 24.0% from 45 to 64, and 12.4% who were 65 years of age or older. The median age was 37 years. For every 100 females, there were 95.7 males. For every 100 females age 18 and over, there were 98.0 males.

The median income for a household in the village was $38,563, and the median income for a family was $41,518. Males had a median income of $36,875 versus $18,500 for females. The per capita income for the village was $17,660. About 5.6% of families and 7.0% of the population were below the poverty line, including 9.9% of those under age 18 and 6.0% of those age 65 or over.

Education
French Settlement is within the Livingston Parish Public Schools system.

French Settlement is served by French Settlement Elementary School and French Settlement High School.

References

Villages in Livingston Parish, Louisiana
Villages in Louisiana
Baton Rouge metropolitan area
French-American culture in Louisiana